Gulnoza Jumaboy qizi Matniyazova (born 10 August 1994) is an Uzbekistani judoka. She competed at the 2016 Summer Olympics in the women's 70 kg event, in which she was eliminated in the first round by Katarzyna Kłys. She also competed in the women's 70 kg event at the 2020 Summer Olympics in Tokyo, Japan.

At the 2019 Asian-Pacific Judo Championships held in Fujairah, United Arab Emirates, she won the silver medal in the women's 70 kg event. In the women's 70 kg event at the 2019 Military World Games held in Wuhan, China, she won one of the bronze medals.

In 2021, she competed in the women's 70 kg event at the Judo World Masters held in Doha, Qatar.

References

External links

 
 
 
 

1994 births
Living people
Uzbekistani female judoka
Olympic judoka of Uzbekistan
Judoka at the 2016 Summer Olympics
Judoka at the 2010 Summer Youth Olympics
Judoka at the 2014 Asian Games
Judoka at the 2018 Asian Games
Asian Games bronze medalists for Uzbekistan
Asian Games medalists in judo
Medalists at the 2018 Asian Games
Judoka at the 2020 Summer Olympics
21st-century Uzbekistani women